RSL may refer to:

Military 
 Reserve static line, in skydiving 
 Returned and Services League of Australia, current name (since 1990) of a defence forces veterans organisation
  Returned Sailors' and Soldiers' Imperial League of Australia (1916–1940)
  Returned Sailors' Soldiers' and Airmen's Imperial League of Australia (1940–1965)
  Returned Services League of Australia (1965–1990)

Sports 
 Real Salt Lake, a US soccer club
 Royal Standard de Liège, a Belgian association football club
 Reserve static line in skydiving 
 Rugby Super League (United States), a rugby union organization
 Russian Superleague, a now defunct hockey league in Russia
 Roshn Saudi League (RSL for short) is the name of the Saudi Professional League for sponsorship reasons.

Technology 
 RAISE Specification Language, a formal approach to software development
 RenderMan Shading Language, a language from the RenderMan Interface Specification used for writing shaders
 Restricted Service Licence, British limited time low power radio or television broadcasting
 Received Signal Level, signal strength of data transmitted via radio waves

Other uses 
 Radcliffe Science Library, Oxford University
 Raid: Shadow Legends, 2018 mobile game by Plarium Games
 Recurrent slope lineae, surface features on Mars
 Registered Social Landlord, a British independent public housing organization
 Relative sea level, the distance from the ocean floor to its surface
 Rennellese Sign Language, an extinct form of home sign documented from Rennell Island in 1974
 Revolutionary Socialist League (disambiguation), the name of several political groups
 Royal Society of Literature, the senior literary organisation in Britain
 Russian Sign Language, a sign language used by the deaf community in Russia
 Russian State Library, the national library of Russia

See also 
 RLS (disambiguation)